Öncüpınar Accommodation Facility is a refugee camp for refugees fleeing the Syrian Civil War located in Öncüpınar village in Kilis, Turkey, near the Syrian border. Opened in 2012, it hosted 14,000 people in February 2014.

The camp consists of 2053 containers, linked with brick paths. Several schools, kindergartens and playgrounds serve the camp's 2000 school children. The camp is fully operated by the Turkish Disaster and Emergency Management Presidency committee.

Kilis was one of the six "container camps" opened by Turkey, which sought to offer a higher life quality than traditional tent camps.

Each refugee family receives a total of $43 per person monthly via a "food card" system, which can be spent in the various shops operating in the camp.

References

Refugee camps in Turkey
Syrian refugee camps
Kilis Province